Dexter W. Very (November 27, 1889 – September 27, 1980) was an American college football player the Penn State Nittany Lions football team of Pennsylvania State University.  Very started at right end for the Nittany Lions in every game from 1909 to 1912.  During that timespan, Penn State was undefeated in 1909, 1911 and 1912, while losing just two games in 1910.

Very was elected as the team's captain in 1911, and helped the Nittany Lions defeat the Penn Quakers, for its first victory over Penn in 18 years.  That game he stripped the Quakers' Ray Mercer of the football and ran it back for a Penn State touchdown.  In 1912, Very scored nine touchdowns in eight games.  He never wore a helmet while playing, and was also a member of the school's wrestling program. 

After college, he worked as a manufacturer's representative in Pittsburgh and also worked as a football official.  He officiated the 1927 Georgia vs. Yale football game. On January 2, 1933, Very officiated the Rose Bowl.  He was elected to the College Football Hall of Fame in 1976.

References

External links
 

1889 births
1980 deaths
American football ends
College football officials
Penn State Nittany Lions football players
College Football Hall of Fame inductees
People from Susquehanna County, Pennsylvania
Players of American football from Pennsylvania